Bhiwandi-Nizampur City Municipal Corporation is a civic body formed after dissolution of "BNCMC" (Bhiwandi-Nizampur City Municipal Council) into a Corporation by an act of Government Of Maharashtra in 2002 to administer the industrial township of Bhiwandi, which is a city in Thane district in the Indian state of Maharashtra. Municipal Corporation mechanism in India was introduced during British Rule with formation of municipal corporation in Madras (Chennai) in 1688, later followed by municipal corporations in Bombay (Mumbai) and Calcutta (Kolkata) by 1762. Bhiwandi-Nizampur Municipal Corporation is headed by Mayor of city and governed by Commissioner. Bhiwandi-Nizampur Municipal Corporation has been formed with functions to improve the infrastructure of town.

The combined population of Bhiwandi-Nizampur and Bhiwandi was 709,665 at the 2011 census.

Revenue sources 

The following are the Income sources for the Corporation from the Central and State Government.

Revenue from taxes  
Following is the Tax related revenue for the corporation.

 Property tax.
 Profession tax.
 Entertainment tax.
 Grants from Central and State Government like Goods and Services Tax.
 Advertisement tax.

Revenue from non-tax sources 

Following is the Non Tax related revenue for the corporation.

 Water usage charges.
 Fees from Documentation services.
 Rent received from municipal property.
 Funds from municipal bonds.

List of Mayors

List of Deputy Mayor

Election results

2017 results

2012 results

Taxes

Octroi
With the introduction of LBT, Octroi was abolished from 21 May 2013.

Local Body Tax
Local Body Tax (LBT) was introduced from 22 May 2013 in the Municipal corporation of Bhiwandi.

References

External links
 Official website

Municipal corporations in Maharashtra
Bhiwandi
2002 establishments in Maharashtra